Kalamandalam M. P. S. Namboodiri is a Kathakali exponent and academic in the field of Kathakali from Kerala, India. He received several noted awards including the Sangeet Natak Akademi Award 2013 and Kerala Kalamandalam mukundaraja smruthi Award 2019.

Biography
Kalamandalam M.P.S. Namboodiri was born in 1943 July 1 in Karikad in present-day Malappuram district to Moothedath Palisseri Manakkal Narayanan Namboothiri and Devasena Antharjanam. Namboodiri studied Kathakali in Kerala Kalamandalam and became a teacher there and retired as a principal. He was reappointed as the dean of the Department of Kathakali when Kalamandalam was upgraded as Deemed University. He is a Visiting Professor at University of California (UCLA) and the University of Wisconsin in the United States. He has published several articles on Kathakali in English and Malayalam and co-authored a book titled Kathakaliyude Rangapathacharithram with Killimangalam Vasudevan Namboodirippad.

Family
He and his wife Leela have three children.

Awards and honors
Sangeet Natak Akademi Award 2013
Kerala Kalamandalam mukundaraja smruthi award 2019

References

1943 births
Living people
20th-century Indian dancers
Dancers from Kerala
Kathakali exponents
People from Malappuram district
Recipients of the Sangeet Natak Akademi Award
Malayali people
Indian male dancers